Urgenda is a nonprofit foundation (stichting) in the Netherlands which aims to help enforce national, European and international environment treaties. In 2013, Urgenda filed a lawsuit against the state of the Netherlands – respectively also against the government – at the court of The Hague, to force them to make more effective policies that reduce the amount of emissions, with the aim to protect the people of the Netherlands against the effects of climate change and pollution.

History
The name Urgenda is a portmanteau of the words urgente (urgent) and agenda. It was founded in 2007 by Jan Rotmans (professor at the Erasmus University (Rotterdam) and Marjan Minnesma (lawyer, economic scientist and philosopher).

Success in court case against the government

Awards
 Doctor honoris causa of Saint-Louis University, Brussels, 2019

References

2007 establishments in the Netherlands
Organizations established in 2007
Climate change organizations
Organisations based in Amsterdam
Foundations based in the Netherlands
Environmental protection